Conducător ("Leader") was the title used officially by Romanian dictator Ion Antonescu during World War II, also occasionally used in official discourse to refer to Carol II and Nicolae Ceaușescu.

History
The word is derived from the Romanian verb a conduce, from the Latin ducere ("to lead" or, "to drive" in Romanian), cognate with such titles as dux, duke, duce and doge. Its meaning also parallels other titles, such as Führer in Nazi Germany, Duce in Fascist Italy and caudillo in Francoist Spain.

It was first employed as an additional title by King Carol II during the final years of the National Renaissance Front regime, and soon after employed by Marshal Ion Antonescu as he assumed dictatorial powers after September 14, 1940. Nominally, Antonescu was Prime Minister and the role of head of state was filled by King Michael, but all real power rested with Antonescu. According to historian Adrian Cioroianu, through the use of the term, Antonescu meant to highlight connections with Germany, and after the fall of the Iron Guard from shared government (the National Legionary State), his own personal regime.

The term was occasionally used in official discourse as a reference to Nicolae Ceaușescu, leader of the Socialist Republic of Romania, starting in the period after 1971, at a time when the Romanian Communist Party grew in membership but decreased in importance due to Ceaușescu's increasing personality cult. It was used in parallel with the rarer cârmaci ("helmsman"), in turn borrowed from similar rhetoric in totalitarian states such as North Korea and China under Mao Zedong. While references to the Party as the "vanguard of the working class" fell out of use, power became centered on Ceauşescu's prerogative to issue orders to the political apparatus.

The choice of the term was also meant to highlight a symbolic connection with the Princes of Wallachia and the Princes of Moldavia (another comparison in use was that between Ceaușescu and the Dacian leaders of Antiquity). Additionally, during the same period, Communist sources began depicting Antonescu in a favorable light. Starting from a model applied to the entire Eastern Bloc by Polish political scientist Andrzej Korboński, differentiating Communist leaderships in types of primus inter pares (collective leadership) and primus (personal rule), Cioroianu concluded that Romania's choice for the latter alternative was most likely based on local political tradition. In Cioroianu's view, Ceaușescu's system drew its other major source of legitimacy from political clientelism (resulting in what he called "an orbital political system").

The new political relations, largely based on the Conducător'''s charisma, were likened to various other dictatorial regimes of the 20th century, and included by Houchang Esfandiar Chehabi and Juan José Linz among the various "Sultanistic regimes"the title itself has drawn comparisons with other ones created by dictatorial leaders for themselves: Aryamehr (used by Iran's Mohammad Reza Pahlavi), Mobutu Sese Seko Kuku Ngbendu Wa Za Banga (in Joseph-Désiré Mobutu's Zaire), the Imperial designation of Central Africa (under Jean-Bédel Bokassa), Benefactor de la Patria (imposed by Rafael Leónidas Trujillo in the Dominican Republic), and Conqueror of the British Empire etc. (in Idi Amin's Uganda).

Influence
Several Serbian sources have repeatedly alleged that the Croatian politician , a member of the League of Communists of Croatia inside Communist Yugoslavia and a confidant of President Josip Broz Tito, was an active campaigner for Croatian independence. Among other allegations, Krajačić was accused of having adopted the nickname "Conducător of Separatism", as a compliment to Ceaușescu's dictatorial stance.

 See also 
 Führer DuceNotes

References
David Berry, The Romanian Mass Media and Cultural Development, Ashgate Publishing, Aldershot, 2004
Henry E. Brady, Cynthia S. Kaplan, "Eastern Europe and the Former Soviet Union", in David Butler, Austin Ranney, Referendums Around the World: The Growing Use of Direct Democracy, American Enterprise Institute, Washington D.C., 1994
Ion C. Butnaru, The Silent Holocaust: Romania and Its Jews, Praeger/Greenwood, Westport, 1992
Houchang Esfandiar Chehabi, Juan José Linz, Sultanistic Regimes, Johns Hopkins University Press, Baltimore, London, 1998
Adrian Cioroianu, Pe umerii lui Marx. O introducere în istoria comunismului românesc ("On the Shoulders of Marx. An Incursion into the History of Romanian Communism"), Editura Curtea Veche, Bucharest, 2005
Tom Gallagher, Theft of a Nation: Romania since Communism, C. Hurst & Co., London, 2005
Barbara Jelavich, History of the Balkans, Cambridge University Press, Cambridge, 1983
Gail Kligman, The Politics of Duplicity: Controlling Reproduction in Ceausescu's Romania, University of California Press, Berkeley, Los Angeles, London, 1998
David Bruce MacDonald, Balkan Holocausts? Serbian and Croatian Victim-Centred Propaganda and the War in Yugoslavia'', Manchester University Press, Manchester, New York 2002

Socialist Republic of Romania
Fascism in Romania
Romania in World War II
Heads of state of Romania
Romanian words and phrases
Titles of national or ethnic leadership